Carrying is a violation in the game of basketball. It occurs when the dribbling player continues to dribble after allowing the ball to come to rest in one or both hands and/or places their hand underneath the basketball. Carrying is like a double dribble, because the player momentarily stops dribbling, then resumes dribbling. If the player is in motion while carrying the ball, then it is similar to traveling (3+ steps).

A type of carrying, known colloquially as palming, involves holding the ball in one hand in a grip without allowing it to fall naturally.

Most basketball players slide their hand to one side of the ball when dribbling to better control the ball, directing it from left to right and vice versa. So long as the ball does not come to rest, not only is this legal, but it also allows more control and easier ball-handling. The problem arises when the ball-handler slides their hand too far down the side of the ball and has their hand below it. A carrying violation is called once the player's hand is below the ball's plane of 90° and the required up and down motion of the ball significantly stops.

Basketball penalties